Jakob Graf und Edler Herr von und zu Eltz-Kempenich genannt Faust von Stromberg, also referred to as Johann Jakob Eltz (22 September 1921 – 10 February 2006) was a Knight of Malta, and a Croatian politician who became a key figure in Croatian politics during the 1990s. In Croatia, he is often styled as the count of Vukovar (vukovarski grof). He was President of the Association of Winemakers in Rheingau from 1964 to 1976. Jakob von und zu Eltz is the maternal grandfather of Karl-Theodor zu Guttenberg, a former German Minister of Defence.

Early life

The son of Count Karl von und zu Eltz-Kempenich (1896–1922) and Princess Sophie of Löwenstein-Wertheim-Rosenberg (1900–1982), Jakob von und zu Eltz was born in Kleinheubach, Bavaria, Germany to the eminent Eltz family, Roman Catholic nobles with ties to Croatia since 1736, when his ancestor Philipp Karl zu Eltz (Prince Elector and Archbishop of Mainz) bought the Lordship of Vukovar. The family owned several estates in Slavonia, including the Eltz castle in Vukovar. When Eltz was seven months old, his father died in a car crash, and his mother then decided to move to Vukovar, where Eltz spent his childhood and attended private schools.

He decided to study agronomics and went to the study at Zagreb and then Tetschen. Following the end of the Second World War, when the communists seized power, the Eltz Croatian estates were seized by the state. He then went to live in West Germany, where he studied law, took over the family's winery estate in Eltville and became a professor of viticulture at Mainz University. He was a member of the Sovereign Council of the Order of Malta and the representative of the order, with the rank as an ambassador, in Germany. He was further known for his charity work and pilgrimages to Lourdes during this time.

In 1946, he married Ladislaja Mayr von Melnhof in Salzburg (1920–2023). She had previously been married to Prince Konrad of Hohenlohe-Ingelfingen (1919–1943). Her mother was a Countess of Meran and belonged to a line of the Habsburg-Lothringen dynasty. They had five daughters and four sons, who married into families like Preysing-Lichtenegg-Moos, Mensdorff-Pouilly and Guttenberg.

In 1991, he was appointed by Croatian President Franjo Tudjman as honorary representative of the Republic of Croatia in Bonn.

He inherited the 800-year-old family seat, Burg Eltz in Rheinland-Pfalz, as the 32nd generation, which he made available to the public.

Politician in Croatia

Eltz returned to Vukovar in 1991 after Croatia declared independence from Yugoslavia where he began working with political leaders to help reconstruct the government. That same year, war broke out and Vukovar became the prime target of shelling by the heavily armed Serbs. He was present during the beginning of the Battle of Vukovar helping with the city's defence and even took up arms to defend it, despite being 70 years old (the Eltz Manor was destroyed during the battle and the tomb and bodies of the Eltz family desecrated). Due to his popularity, he was persuaded to run for office, and was elected by a large majority to the Croatian parliament in 1992 as an independent candidate for Vukovar. He also became a member of the parliamentary assembly of the Council of Europe where he promoted Croatia's case to joining the European Union.

He continued serving in the Croatian parliament until his retirement in 1999, and was so highly regarded that he was asked to continue as an honorary member in his own right. He spoke six languages: Croatian, German, English, French, Italian, and Latin. He died in 2006 in Eltville, Germany.

Ancestry

Honours and awards
Freeman of the Johannes Gutenberg University Mainz
Knight of the Order of the Golden Fleece
Maltese National Order of Merit

References
 Umro grof Jakob Eltz
 Eltz castle
 Jakob Eltz
 Serbian Extremists Desecrate Croatian Church

1921 births
2006 deaths
People from Kleinheubach
Croatian people of German descent
Croatian nobility
Counts of Germany
Knights of Malta
Representatives in the modern Croatian Parliament
Knights of the Golden Fleece
Recipients of the National Order of Merit (Malta)
People from the Rheingau
Eltz